Eduard Johan Pieter Jorissen (10 June 1829, Zwolle – 20 March 1912, Scheveningen) was a Dutch lawyer and politician. He graduated in theology and served as State Attorney of the South African Republic from 1876 to 1877 under Thomas François Burgers.

References

1829 births
1912 deaths
South African Republic politicians
Dutch expatriates in South Africa
19th-century Dutch lawyers
People from Zwolle
Utrecht University alumni
19th-century South African lawyers